Wang Guoming (Chinese: 王国明; Pinyin: Wáng Guómíng; born 2 February 1990) is a Chinese footballer who plays as a goalkeeper for Chinese Super League side Henan Jianye.

Club career
Wang Guoming joined Dalian Shide's youth team at the age of 13 in 2003. At his time with their youth academy he was sent out to Dalian Shide's satellite team Dalian Shide Siwu, who played as a foreign team in Singapore's S.League in the 2008 league season. While in the Singapore league he was team's first choice goalkeeper as he helped guide the team to a tenth-place finish at the end of the season. Upon his return he was promoted to Dalian Shide's first team squad in the summer of 2010.

He was loaned to China League Two club Fujian Smart Hero for one year in 2011. He transferred to Fujian Smart Hero in 2012 after helping the club promote to China League One. He played as the first choice goalkeeper of the club and followed the club to move to Shijiazhuang in 2013. After impressive performance in 2014 season, which made him the best goalkeeper of 2014 China League One, he finally returned to Chinese Super League in 2015. On 9 March 2015, Wang made his Super League debut in the season's first match which Shijiazhuang lost to Guangzhou Evergrande 2–1. Wang was the first choice goalkeeper at the beginning of the season; however, he lost his position to Guan Zhen after May 2015.

On 26 February 2016, Wang transferred to fellow Chinese Super League side Henan Jianye. He made his debut for Henan on 5 March 2016 in a 1–0 home win against Shanghai SIPG.

Career statistics 
Statistics accurate as of match played 31 December 2020.

References

External links
 

1990 births
Living people
Chinese footballers
Footballers from Dalian
Association football goalkeepers
Chinese Super League players
China League One players
China League Two players
Dalian Shide F.C. players
Cangzhou Mighty Lions F.C. players
Henan Songshan Longmen F.C. players